"Babe It's Up to You" is a song by the British rock band Smokie from their 1979 studio album The Other Side of the Road. It was the album's second single.

Background and writing 
The song was written by Gloria "Glo" Macari and Roger Ferris and produced by Smokie.

Commercial performance 
The song reached no. 8 in Germany.

Charts

Cover versions 
Chris Norman included his solo cover of the song on his 2000 studio album "Full Circle".
Czech singer Pavel Novák - czech version Hrušky

References

External links 

 Smokie — "Babe It's Up to You" (1979) at Discogs

1979 songs
1979 singles
Smokie (band) songs
RAK Records singles
Songs written by Roger Ferris